Dayal Nagar is a village of Nadia district in the state of West Bengal, India. It is located at 23°59′N 88°41′E. It is located at a distance 23 km from Krishnagar, district headquarters. The nearby railway Station is Bethuadahari Railway Station. It is 2.5 km away (towards South) from Bethuadahari Town.

Area
Total area is 80 hectare i.e. 0.80 square KM including a cultivation area of 57 hectare.

Population
Population as per 2011 census record:
Total: 1545
Male: 816
Female: 729

History
Many people emigrated to Dayal Nagar from Bangladesh at the time of the partition of India in 1947 and latter on, in 1971. Initially, there were several camps set up by the government which were referred to by numbers. Today there are many places where the old numbering system is still used.

Geography

40% of the land is undeveloped and is used for cultivation, Typical crops are rice, wheat, mustard, jute and vegetables. Farmers of this area are famous for continuous production of different types of Vegetables throughout the year. 5% of the land is ponds and lakes used for fish production.

Economy
Most of the people are dependent on cultivation and small capital business. Besides this, there are many people who secured their job in Govt. Services in WBCS, Engineer, School Teacher, Rail, Bank, Police etc.

Transport
Dayal Nagar is connected with Kolkata and the rest of the district by Bethuadahari Railway Station and NH-34. Buses operated by SBSTC, CSTC, NBSTC and many other private buses provide reliable means of road transportation. Long distance Buses connect Dayal Nagar to main cities of west Bengal, such as- Kolkata (130 km), Siliguri (445 km), Howrah (153 km), Coochbehar (569 km), Durgapur (185 km), Malda (189 km), Digha (325 km). The other means of road transport in the village include Rickshaws, Vans, Cycle, bikes, cars etc.

Climate
According to the Köppen climate classification System Dayal Nagar has a Tropical Wet and Dry or Tropical Savanna type climate. It features a long and hot Summer followed by- wet and humid Monsoon, cloudless and pleasant Autumn, mild and dry Winter, sunny and warm Spring.

Villages in Nadia district